"Chasing the dragon" (CTD), or "foily" in Australian English, refers to inhaling the vapor from a heated solution of a powdered psychoactive drug on a sheet of aluminum foil. The moving vapor is chased after with a tube (often rolled foil) through which the user inhales. The "chasing" occurs as the user gingerly keeps the liquid moving in order to keep it from overheating and burning up too quickly, on a heat conducting material such as aluminium foil.

Another use of the term "chasing the dragon" refers to the elusive pursuit of a high equal to the user’s first in the use of a drug, which after acclimation is no longer achievable. Used in this way, “chasing the dragon” can refer to any recreational drug administered by any means.

Etymology
Chasing the dragon is a slang phrase of Cantonese origin from Hong Kong. The Hong Kong film Chasing the Dragon is named from the origin of the etymology.

Cultural aspects
Aluminum foil is considered to be low-quality drug paraphernalia. It is commonly associated with drug abuse. Hard drugs that are commonly inhaled this way include but are not limited to morphine, heroin, fentanyl, oxycodone, opium, and ya ba (a pill containing caffeine and methamphetamine).

Advantages 
This method of intake significantly decreases or eliminates certain risks of heroin use, such as the transmission of HIV, hepatitis, and other blood-borne diseases through needle sharing, the introduction of skin bacteria to the bloodstream due to non-sterile injection, and the stress that injection puts on veins. Oral administration may also eliminate these risks, but the high is much less intense and longer.

Risks 
It is always harmful to expose the lungs to any kind of smoke or heated vapor.

Drug overdose 
A drug overdose caused by chasing the dragon is hard to predict because this technique does not deliver a standardized dosage. It is virtually impossible even for skilled users to know how much of the substance has been evaporated, burned, and inhaled. These combined factors may create a false sense of security when a given dose seems safe to repeat, but may cause an overdose when all the factors are randomly excluded.

A vaporizer is a safer drug paraphernalia than aluminum foil.

Lung cancer from natural talc 
Talc is an excipient often used in pharmaceutical tablets. Also, illicit drugs that occur as white powder in their pure form are often cut with cheap talc. Natural talc is cheap but contains asbestos while asbestos-free talc is more expensive. Talc that has asbestos is generally accepted as being able to cause lung cancer if it is inhaled. The evidence about asbestos-free talc is less clear, according to the American Cancer Society.

Talc can be avoided by dissolving the substance in water, filtering and discarding non-dissolving particles with a syringe, and evaporating the water of the dissolved substances.

Substance specific

Heroin 
Inhaling heroin appears to rarely lead to toxic leukoencephalopathy. There are also documented cases of both severe acute asthma and exacerbation of underlying asthma caused by heroin inhalation, potentially resulting in death.

See also
 Love rose
 One-hitter (smoking)
 Opium pipe
 Pizzo (pipe)

References 

Drug culture
Cantonese words and phrases
Drug paraphernalia
Opium culture